Audea stenophaea is a moth of the family Erebidae. It is found in India, where it has been recorded from the Palni Hills.

References

Moths described in 1913
Audea
Moths of Asia